
Gmina Prabuty is an urban-rural gmina (administrative district) in Kwidzyn County, Pomeranian Voivodeship, in northern Poland.

Villages
Apart from the town of Prabuty, Gmina Prabuty contains the villages and settlements of Antonin, Bronowo Małe, Gdakowo, Gilwa, Gonty, Górowychy, Górowychy Małe, Grazymowo, Grodziec, Halinowo, Jakubowo, Julianowo, Kałdowo, Kamienna, Kleczewo, Kołodzieje, Kolonia Gąski, Kowale, Laskowice, Laskowicki Tartak, Młynisko, Obrzynowo, Orkusz, Pachutki, Pałatyki, Pilichowo, Pólko, Raniewo, Rodowo, Rodowo Małe, Rumunki, Stańkowo, Stary Kamień, Stary Młyn, Sypanica, Szramowo, Trumiejki and Zagaje.

Neighbouring gminas
Gmina Prabuty is bordered by the gminas of Gardeja, Kisielice, Kwidzyn, Mikołajki Pomorskie, Ryjewo, Stary Dzierzgoń and Susz.

References
Polish official population figures 2006

Prabuty
Kwidzyn County